Nuno Ricardo Santos Belchior better known as Belchior (born 9 October 1982) is a Portuguese beach soccer player. He plays in forward position.

Honours

National team
 Portugal
Euro Beach Soccer League winner: 2007, 2008
Euro Beach Soccer League runner-up: 2004, 2005, 2006, 2009
FIFA Beach Soccer World Cup winner: 2015, 2019
FIFA Beach Soccer World Cup runner-up: 2005
FIFA Beach Soccer World Cup third place: 2003, 2004, 2008
FIFA Beach Soccer World Cup fourth place: 2006
Euro Beach Soccer League Portuguese Event  winner : 2004, 2005, 2006, 2007
Euro Beach Soccer League Italian Event  runner-up : 2005, 2007
Euro Beach Soccer League Italian Event  third place: 2006
Euro Beach Soccer League Spanish Event  winner : 2005
Euro Beach Soccer League Spanish Event  runner-up : 2006
Euro Beach Soccer League Spanish Event  third place: 2007
Euro Beach Soccer League French Event winner : 2004, 2005
Copa Latina runner-up: 2003
Mundialito winner: 2003, 2008, 2009
Mundialito runner-up:  2005, 2006, 2007
Mundialito fourth place: 2004

Individual

FIFA Beach Soccer World Cup Bronze Shoe: 2008
FIFA Beach Soccer World Cup Bronze Ball: 2008
Euro Beach Soccer League French Event Top Scorer: 2004

External links
Biography

1982 births
Living people
Sportspeople from Barreiro, Portugal
Portuguese beach soccer players
European Games bronze medalists for Portugal
Beach soccer players at the 2015 European Games
European Games medalists in beach soccer
Beach soccer players at the 2019 European Games
European Games gold medalists for Portugal